The 1975–76 Philadelphia Flyers season was the Philadelphia Flyers' ninth season in the National Hockey League (NHL). The Flyers reached the Stanley Cup Finals for the third consecutive year, but they lost to the Montreal Canadiens in a four-game sweep.

Regular season
The Flyers recorded the best record in team history (points wise) with a record of 51–13–16 in 1975–76. They also tied the record set by the 1929–30 Boston Bruins for most consecutive home ice wins, with 20.  The LCB line, featuring Reggie Leach at right-wing, Bobby Clarke at center, and Bill Barber at left-wing, set an NHL record for goals by a single line with 141 (Leach 61, Clarke 30, Barber 50). Clarke, on his way to a third Hart Trophy, set a club record for points in one season with 119.

The highlight of the season had no bearing on the season standings. On January 11 at the Spectrum, the Flyers, as part of the Super Series '76, played a memorable exhibition game against the Soviet Union's dominant Central Red Army team. As the Bullies had put intimidation to good use the past three years, the Flyers' rugged style of play led the Soviets to leave the ice midway through the first period, protesting a hit by Ed Van Impe on Valeri Kharlamov (whom Clarke had slashed on the ankle in the famous Summit Series '72). After some delay, the Soviets returned after they were warned that they would lose their salary for the entire series. The Flyers went on to win the game rather easily, 4–1, and were the only team to defeat the Red Army outright in the series. Head coach Fred Shero would proclaim, "Yes we are world champions. If they had won, they would have been world champions. We beat the hell out of a machine."

Season standings

Playoffs
Heading into the playoffs, the Flyers squeaked past Toronto in seven games and defeated Boston in five games, Game 5 featuring a five-goal outburst by Leach, the Riverton Rifle, to head to a third straight appearance in the Stanley Cup Finals. However, the Flyers didn't come close to a third straight championship, as they ran into an up-and-coming dynasty in Montreal, and were swept in four straight games. Despite the loss, Leach was awarded the Conn Smythe Trophy for scoring 19 goals in 16 playoff games.

Schedule and results

Regular season

|- style="background:#cfc;"
| 1 || October 9 || Washington Capitals || 5–4 || 1–0–0 || 2 || 
|- style="background:#cfc;"
| 2 || October 11 || @ Minnesota North Stars || 9–5 || 2–0–0 || 4 || 
|- style="background:#cfc;"
| 3 || October 12 || California Golden Seals || 4–1 || 3–0–0 || 6 || 
|- style="background:#cfc;"
| 4 || October 16 || St. Louis Blues || 3–2 || 4–0–0 || 8 || 
|- style="background:#ffc;"
| 5 || October 18 || @ Montreal Canadiens || 2–2 || 4–0–1 || 9 || 
|- style="background:#cfc;"
| 6 || October 19 || Detroit Red Wings || 5–1 || 5–0–1 || 11 || 
|- style="background:#fcf;"
| 7 || October 23 || @ New York Islanders || 0–3 || 5–1–1 || 11 || 
|- style="background:#ffc;"
| 8 || October 25 || @ Pittsburgh Penguins || 4–4 || 5–1–2 || 12 || 
|- style="background:#cfc;"
| 9 || October 26 || @ New York Rangers || 7–2 || 6–1–2 || 14 || 
|- style="background:#cfc;"
| 10 || October 30 || Toronto Maple Leafs || 6–2 || 7–1–2 || 16 || 
|-

|- style="background:#cfc;"
| 11 || November 1 || Boston Bruins || 8–1 || 8–1–2 || 18 || 
|- style="background:#cfc;"
| 12 || November 2 || Kansas City Scouts || 10–0 || 9–1–2 || 20 || 
|- style="background:#ffc;"
| 13 || November 5 || @ Chicago Black Hawks || 4–4 || 9–1–3 || 21 || 
|- style="background:#ffc;"
| 14 || November 6 || Los Angeles Kings || 1–1 || 9–1–4 || 22 || 
|- style="background:#fcf;"
| 15 || November 8 || New York Islanders || 3–4 || 9–2–4 || 22 || 
|- style="background:#cfc;"
| 16 || November 9 || Pittsburgh Penguins || 6–4 || 10–2–4 || 24 || 
|- style="background:#cfc;"
| 17 || November 12 || @ Buffalo Sabres || 3–1 || 11–2–4 || 26 || 
|- style="background:#ffc;"
| 18 || November 13 || Chicago Black Hawks || 5–5 || 11–2–5 || 27 || 
|- style="background:#fcf;"
| 19 || November 15 || @ Detroit Red Wings || 1–3 || 11–3–5 || 27 || 
|- style="background:#cfc;"
| 20 || November 16 || Montreal Canadiens || 3–1 || 12–3–5 || 29 || 
|- style="background:#cfc;"
| 21 || November 20 || California Golden Seals || 3–2 || 13–3–5 || 31 || 
|- style="background:#cfc;"
| 22 || November 22 || New York Rangers || 4–2 || 14–3–5 || 33 || 
|- style="background:#cfc;"
| 23 || November 26 || Atlanta Flames || 7–3 || 15–3–5 || 35 || 
|- style="background:#ffc;"
| 24 || November 29 || @ Toronto Maple Leafs || 1–1 || 15–3–6 || 36 || 
|- style="background:#cfc;"
| 25 || November 30 || Vancouver Canucks || 5–3 || 16–3–6 || 38 || 
|-

|- style="background:#cfc;"
| 26 || December 4 || Chicago Black Hawks || 5–2 || 17–3–6 || 40 || 
|- style="background:#fcf;"
| 27 || December 6 || @ St. Louis Blues || 2–7 || 17–4–6 || 40 || 
|- style="background:#cfc;"
| 28 || December 7 || Minnesota North Stars || 6–1 || 18–4–6 || 42 || 
|- style="background:#ffc;"
| 29 || December 10 || @ California Golden Seals || 1–1 || 18–4–7 || 43 || 
|- style="background:#cfc;"
| 30 || December 13 || @ Los Angeles Kings || 6–4 || 19–4–7 || 45 || 
|- style="background:#cfc;"
| 31 || December 17 || @ Chicago Black Hawks || 4–2 || 20–4–7 || 47 || 
|- style="background:#cfc;"
| 32 || December 19 || @ Washington Capitals || 7–5 || 21–4–7 || 49 || 
|- style="background:#cfc;"
| 33 || December 21 || St. Louis Blues || 8–3 || 22–4–7 || 51 || 
|- style="background:#ffc;"
| 34 || December 23 || @ Atlanta Flames || 2–2 || 22–4–8 || 52 || 
|- style="background:#fcf;"
| 35 || December 28 || Boston Bruins || 2–4 || 22–5–8 || 52 || 
|- style="background:#fcf;"
| 36 || December 30 || @ New York Islanders || 2–6 || 22–6–8 || 52 || 
|-

|- style="background:#cfc;"
| 37 || January 1 || @ Kansas City Scouts || 4–2 || 23–6–8 || 54 || 
|- style="background:#cfc;"
| 38 || January 3 || @ Pittsburgh Penguins || 8–4 || 24–6–8 || 56 || 
|- style="background:#cfc;"
| 39 || January 4 || New York Islanders || 5–3 || 25–6–8 || 58 || 
|- style="background:#cfc;"
| 40 || January 7 || @ Toronto Maple Leafs || 7–3 || 26–6–8 || 60 || 
|- style="background:#cfc;"
| 41 || January 8 || Los Angeles Kings || 6–4 || 27–6–8 || 62 || 
|- style="background:#cfc;"
| 42 || January 15 || Pittsburgh Penguins || 4–1 || 28–6–8 || 64 || 
|- style="background:#cfc;"
| 43 || January 17 || @ Kansas City Scouts || 7–1 || 29–6–8 || 66 || 
|- style="background:#fcf;"
| 44 || January 18 || @ Chicago Black Hawks || 0–2 || 29–7–8 || 66 || 
|- style="background:#cfc;"
| 45 || January 22 || Atlanta Flames || 7–2 || 30–7–8 || 68 || 
|- style="background:#fcf;"
| 46 || January 24 || @ Montreal Canadiens || 3–5 || 30–8–8 || 68 || 
|- style="background:#fcf;"
| 47 || January 25 || @ Boston Bruins || 3–5 || 30–9–8 || 68 || 
|- style="background:#fcf;"
| 48 || January 27 || @ Atlanta Flames || 4–8 || 30–10–8 || 68 || 
|- style="background:#ffc;"
| 49 || January 29 || @ Buffalo Sabres || 1–1 || 30–10–9 || 69 || 
|- style="background:#ffc;"
| 50 || January 31 || @ Minnesota North Stars || 3–3 || 30–10–10 || 70 || 
|-

|- style="background:#cfc;"
| 51 || February 5 || Vancouver Canucks || 6–1 || 31–10–10 || 72 || 
|- style="background:#cfc;"
| 52 || February 7 || St. Louis Blues || 8–2 || 32–10–10 || 74 || 
|- style="background:#cfc;"
| 53 || February 8 || New York Islanders || 4–2 || 33–10–10 || 76 || 
|- style="background:#cfc;"
| 54 || February 12 || New York Rangers || 6–1 || 34–10–10 || 78 || 
|- style="background:#cfc;"
| 55 || February 13 || @ New York Rangers || 5–3 || 35–10–10 || 80 || 
|- style="background:#cfc;"
| 56 || February 15 || Montreal Canadiens || 2–1 || 36–10–10 || 82 || 
|- style="background:#ffc;"
| 57 || February 17 || Vancouver Canucks || 2–2 || 36–10–11 || 83 || 
|- style="background:#cfc;"
| 58 || February 18 || @ Vancouver Canucks || 6–4 || 37–10–11 || 85 || 
|- style="background:#cfc;"
| 59 || February 20 || @ California Golden Seals || 5–4 || 38–10–11 || 87 || 
|- style="background:#ffc;"
| 60 || February 21 || @ Los Angeles Kings || 3–3 || 38–10–12 || 88 || 
|- style="background:#ffc;"
| 61 || February 24 || @ Washington Capitals || 5–5 || 38–10–13 || 89 || 
|- style="background:#cfc;"
| 62 || February 26 || Minnesota North Stars || 3–2 || 39–10–13 || 91 || 
|- style="background:#ffc;"
| 63 || February 28 || @ St. Louis Blues || 2–2 || 39–10–14 || 92 || 
|- style="background:#cfc;"
| 64 || February 29 || California Golden Seals || 6–1 || 40–10–14 || 94 || 
|-

|- style="background:#cfc;"
| 65 || March 4 || @ Kansas City Scouts || 6–1 || 41–10–14 || 96 || 
|- style="background:#cfc;"
| 66 || March 6 || Detroit Red Wings || 6–1 || 42–10–14 || 98 || 
|- style="background:#cfc;"
| 67 || March 7 || Kansas City Scouts || 4–1 || 43–10–14 || 100 || 
|- style="background:#cfc;"
| 68 || March 11 || Buffalo Sabres || 6–1 || 44–10–14 || 102 || 
|- style="background:#cfc;"
| 69 || March 14 || Atlanta Flames || 6–1 || 45–10–14 || 104 || 
|- style="background:#cfc;"
| 70 || March 16 || @ Atlanta Flames || 4–2 || 46–10–14 || 106 || 
|- style="background:#cfc;"
| 71 || March 18 || Vancouver Canucks || 3–2 || 47–10–14 || 108 || 
|- style="background:#fcf;"
| 72 || March 20 || @ Detroit Red Wings || 2–4 || 47–11–14 || 108 || 
|- style="background:#cfc;"
| 73 || March 21 || Toronto Maple Leafs || 4–2 || 48–11–14 || 110 || 
|- style="background:#ffc;"
| 74 || March 23 || @ Minnesota North Stars || 3–3 || 48–11–15 || 111 || 
|- style="background:#cfc;"
| 75 || March 25 || New York Rangers || 4–1 || 49–11–15 || 113 || 
|- style="background:#ffc;"
| 76 || March 27 || @ Boston Bruins || 4–4 || 49–11–16 || 114 || 
|- style="background:#fcf;"
| 77 || March 29 || @ New York Islanders || 1–5 || 49–12–16 || 114 || 
|-

|- style="background:#cfc;"
| 78 || April 1 || Washington Capitals || 11–2 || 50–12–16 || 116 || 
|- style="background:#cfc;"
| 79 || April 3 || Buffalo Sabres || 5–2 || 51–12–16 || 118 || 
|- style="background:#fcf;"
| 80 || April 4 || New York Islanders || 0–2 || 51–13–16 || 118 || 
|-

|-
| Legend:

Playoffs

|- style="background:#cfc;"
| 1 || April 12 || Toronto Maple Leafs || 4–1 || Flyers lead 1–0 || 
|- style="background:#cfc;"
| 2 || April 13 || Toronto Maple Leafs || 3–1 || Flyers lead 2–0 || 
|- style="background:#fcf;"
| 3 || April 15 || @ Toronto Maple Leafs || 4–5 || Flyers lead 2–1 || 
|- style="background:#fcf;"
| 4 || April 17 || @ Toronto Maple Leafs || 2–4 || Series tied 2–2 || 
|- style="background:#cfc;"
| 5 || April 20 || Toronto Maple Leafs || 7–1 || Flyers lead 3–2 || 
|- style="background:#fcf;"
| 6 || April 22 || @ Toronto Maple Leafs || 5–8 || Series tied 3–3 || 
|- style="background:#cfc;"
| 7 || April 25 || Toronto Maple Leafs || 7–3 || Flyers win 4–3 || 
|-

|- style="background:#fcf;"
| 1 || April 27 || Boston Bruins || 2–4 || Bruins lead 1–0 || 
|- style="background:#cfc;"
| 2 || April 29 || Boston Bruins || 2–1 OT || Series tied 1–1 || 
|- style="background:#cfc;"
| 3 || May 2 || @ Boston Bruins || 5–2 || Flyers lead 2–1 || 
|- style="background:#cfc;"
| 4 || May 4 || @ Boston Bruins || 4–2 || Flyers lead 3–1 || 
|- style="background:#cfc;"
| 5 || May 6 || Boston Bruins || 6–3 || Flyers win 4–1 || 
|-

|- style="background:#fcf;"
| 1 || May 9 || @ Montreal Canadiens || 3–4 || Canadiens lead 1–0 || 
|- style="background:#fcf;"
| 2 || May 11 || @ Montreal Canadiens || 1–2 || Canadiens lead 2–0 || 
|- style="background:#fcf;"
| 3 || May 13 || Montreal Canadiens || 2–3 || Canadiens lead 3–0 || 
|- style="background:#fcf;"
| 4 || May 16 || Montreal Canadiens || 3–5 || Canadiens win 4–0 || 
|-

|-
| Legend:

Player statistics

Scoring
 Position abbreviations: C = Center; D = Defense; G = Goaltender; LW = Left Wing; RW = Right Wing
  = Joined team via a transaction (e.g., trade, waivers, signing) during the season. Stats reflect time with the Flyers only.
  = Left team via a transaction (e.g., trade, waivers, release) during the season. Stats reflect time with the Flyers only.

Goaltending
  = Joined team via a transaction (e.g., trade, waivers, signing) during the season. Stats reflect time with the Flyers only.
  = Left team via a transaction (e.g., trade, waivers, release) during the season. Stats reflect time with the Flyers only.

Awards and records

Awards

Records

The LCB line of Reggie Leach, Bobby Clarke, and Bill Barber set a number of franchise records during the 1975–76 season. The trios combined totals of 141 goals and 322 points is the most by one Flyers line. Leach became the first Flyer to score 60 goals in a season, setting the high mark of 61. Clarke’s 89 assists on the season tied his franchise record from the previous season and his 1.17 assists per game average is a franchise high. Clarke was one of two Flyers to set a record franchise streak, going twelve consecutive games with an assist from March 11 to April 3. The other was goaltender Wayne Stephenson’s 14-game home winning streak from January 4 to March 18. Barber’s 380 shots on goal set a franchise single season high. The team as a whole set the single season franchise records for most home wins (36, tied for the NHL record), fewest home losses (2), most points (118), and best points percentage (.738). Their 20 consecutive home wins from January 4 to April 3 is also a franchise record. During their April 1 game against the Washington Capitals, the Flyers recorded a franchise single game high 62 shots on goal.

The Flyers set a number of franchise records during their quarterfinal series against the Toronto Maple Leafs. During game three on April 15, the team recorded 30 penalties and 107 penalty minutes, including 17 penalties during the second period, all franchise playoffs highs. In game six on April 22, enforcer Dave Schultz set an NHL record with 42 penalty minutes in a single playoff game. Tom Bladon and Leach also combined to score the two fastest goals in only eight seconds during the second period. During the second period of game seven three days later, the Flyers scored five goals and set the team playoff records for the fastest three goals (1:21) and four goals (3:16), as well as the fastest two goals from the start of any period for one player (Mel Bridgman in 6:04). The Flyers recorded a franchise single series high 33 goals scored and 295 penalty minutes while Schultz set the NHL record with 116 penalty minutes during the series.

Conn Smythe Trophy winner Reggie Leach set or tied three NHL playoff records. His 19 goals scored during the playoffs is tied for the NHL record with Jari Kurri. He scored the first and only five-goal game in team history during the fifth and final game against the Boston Bruins on May 6, which is also tied for the NHL record with four other players. Leach’s 10-game goal scoring streak from April 17 to May 9 is an NHL record and his 11-game point streak from April 15 to May 9 is a franchise record.

Milestones

Transactions
The Flyers were involved in the following transactions from May 28, 1975, the day after the deciding game of the 1975 Stanley Cup Finals, through May 16, 1976, the day of the deciding game of the 1976 Stanley Cup Finals.

Trades

Players acquired

Players lost

Signings

Draft picks

Philadelphia's picks at the 1975 NHL Amateur Draft, which was held at the NHL's office in Montreal, Quebec, on June 3, 1975. The Flyers traded their second-round pick, 36th overall, along with the rights to Randy Andreachuk to the St. Louis Blues for Wayne Stephenson on September 16, 1974.

Farm teams
The Flyers were affiliated with the Richmond Robins of the AHL and the Philadelphia Firebirds of the NAHL.

Cultural References
In The Simpsons Treehouse of Horror IV segment, The Devil and Homer Simpson, the starting lineup of the 1976 Philadelphia Flyers, are included as members of the Devil's Jury of the Damned.

Notes

References
General
 
 
 
Specific

External links
 

Philadelphia Flyers seasons
Philadelphia
Philadelphia
Patrick Division champion seasons
Western Conference (NHL) championship seasons
National Hockey League All-Star Game hosts
Philad
Philad